Haptocillium is a genus of fungi within the Ophiocordycipitaceae family. There are 9 species.

Species
Haptocillium bactrosporum
Haptocillium balanoides
Haptocillium campanulatum
Haptocillium glocklingiae
Haptocillium obovatum
Haptocillium rhabdosporum
Haptocillium sinense
Haptocillium sphaerosporum
Haptocillium zeosporum

External links
Index Fungorum

Sordariomycetes genera
Ophiocordycipitaceae